The 1985 Cherry Bowl was a postseason college football bowl game between the Atlantic Coast Conference's Maryland Terrapins and the Syracuse Orangemen. After an early 10–6 lead, The Orangemen gave up 22 unanswered second-quarter points, falling too far behind for a comeback and allowing the Terps to win with a final score of 35–18.

Although it was only the second edition, the bowl folded after this game when the Cherry Bowl committee found it was more than $2,000,000 over budget. This ended postseason college football in Detroit until 1997, when the Motor City Bowl launched and the MAC Championship Game was first played on a neutral site.

Scoring summary

First quarter
Syracuse – McAulay 26, field goal
Maryland – Gelbaugh 4, run (kick failed)

Second quarter
Syracuse -Drummond 10, run (McAulay kick)
Maryland -Knight 3, pass from Gelbaugh (Badajnek run)
Maryland -Tye 8, fumble recovery (Plocki kick)
Maryland -Blount 20, run (Plocki kick)

Third quarter
Maryland – Abdur-Ra’oof 6, pass from Gelbaugh (Plocki kick)
Syracuse – McPherson 17, run (Schwedes from McPherson)

Statistics

References

Cherry Bowl
Maryland Terrapins football bowl games
Syracuse Orange football bowl games
1985 in sports in Michigan
December 1985 sports events in the United States